

F

References